Bur Dubai (in Arabic: بر دبي) is a historic district in Dubai, United Arab Emirates, located on the western side of the Dubai Creek. The name literally translates to Mainland Dubai, a reference to the traditional separation of the Bur Dubai area from Deira by the Dubai Creek.

The Ruler's Court is located in the district adjacent to the Grand Mosque.
The district is home to several mosques including the Grand Mosque with the city's tallest minaret, and the blue tiled Iranian Mosque.
Most Indian expatriate families live in Bur Dubai, due to the proximity of a Hindu temple that was established in the 1960s.
It is home to several popular places for tourists including renovated historic buildings and museums. The district has many shopping streets and souqs, including the Textile Souq near the abra boat station, though most of the well-known souqs are located in Deira. Bur Dubai has many shops and restaurants, particularly Indian restaurants.

Historic area

The Al Bastakiya historic area is located to the east of Al Fahidi Fort (now home to Dubai Museum) and features old courtyard housing which are identifiable with their wind towers. Shindagha to the northwest, located between Bur Dubai, the creek, and the sea is the historic location of the ruler's house on the peninsula facing the sea and the creek.

Modern developments
Between 2013 and 2016, the Dubai Creek was extended back to the sea from Business Bay to Jumeirah, forming the Dubai Water Canal and turning Bur Dubai into an island. Bur Dubai is a popular living area consisting of several apartment buildings.

The Dubai Metro Green Line goes through Bur Dubai connecting with the airport through Al Ghubaiba Metro Station & Union Metro Station.

Bur Dubai is also now home to some iconic buildings, like the Wafi Mall and Dubai Frame. There are also many places to go to like the Dubai Museum, which is located near the Grand Mosque and the temple, and the many malls.

References

Central business districts in the United Arab Emirates
Communities in Dubai